Cape Plenty is the southeast cape of Gibbs Island (actually marks south point of the island), in the South Shetland Islands. Visited by JSEEIG in January 1977 and so named because a reef east of the cape causes upwelling of water which attracts numerous birds to feed in the area. Approved by United Kingdom Antarctic Place-Names Committee (UK-APC) in 1980.

References

Headlands of Antarctica